William Noel-Hill, 3rd Baron Berwick, PC, FSA (21 October 1773 – 4 August 1842) was a British peer, politician and diplomatist.

Born William Hill, he was the second son of Noel Hill, who was created first Baron Berwick in 1784, and his wife, Anna, a maternal granddaughter of Thomas Wentworth, 1st Earl of Strafford. He was educated at Rugby School and Jesus College, Cambridge, graduating M.A. in 1793.

He was Tory Member of Parliament for Shrewsbury from 1796 to 1812, when he retired on account of his absences abroad. In 1814 he replaced his brother-in-law Lord Ailesbury (who had inherited his father's earldom) as MP for Marlborough and kept the seat until the 1818 general election, although he spent little time in Parliament.

He held command, as major, of the Shrewsbury Yeomanry Cavalry from its inception in 1798 until 1804, when the command was handed to Charles Dallas, and of the Shropshire Militia as lieutenant-colonel from 1801 to 1814, although diplomatic duty abroad took him away from duty in this country.

Hill went to France as attaché to the British chargé d'affaires in Paris in November 1801, and was on duty during the truce brought about by the Peace of Amiens.  When war with Napoleon resumed he was briefly in captivity but escaped to England. In 1805, Hill was appointed ambassador to Ratisbon (though the Napoleonic Wars prevented him from taking up office), to the Kingdom of Sardinia, whose court was exiled by the war in Cagliari in 1807 and at Turin in 1814 following Napoleon's defeat, and to the Kingdom of the Two Sicilies at Naples in 1824. That same year he and his younger brother assumed the additional surname of Noel, from his grandfather, and was created a Privy Councillor. In 1822, he had rejected George Canning's offer of the post of Parliamentary Under-Secretary of State for Foreign Affairs.

In 1832, he inherited the barony of Berwick from his childless older brother, Thomas. Although he was briefly engaged to Lady Hester Stanhope, he died unmarried and without legitimate issue at Red Rice, Hampshire, in 1842, aged sixty-eight, and his title passed to his younger brother, Richard. He was buried in the family vault at St Eata's parish church, Atcham.

Coat of arms

Notes

References
H. C. G. Matthew, "Hill, William Noel, third Baron Berwick (1773–1842)", Oxford Dictionary of National Biography, Oxford University Press, 2004; online edn, May 2005

1773 births
1842 deaths
People educated at Rugby School
Alumni of Jesus College, Cambridge
Diplomatic peers
Hill, William
British MPs 1796–1800
Hill, William
UK MPs 1801–1802
UK MPs 1802–1806
UK MPs 1806–1807
UK MPs 1807–1812
UK MPs 1812–1818
UK MPs who inherited peerages
Ambassadors of the United Kingdom to the Kingdom of the Two Sicilies
Members of the Privy Council of the United Kingdom
William